Vettavalam is a first grade panchayat town in Tiruvanamalai district in the Indian state of Tamil Nadu.

Geography
It has an average elevation of 211 metres (692 feet).

Vettavalam is in between Tiruvannamalai and Villupuram NH38(Villupuram to Mangalore National Highway).

There is a big lake in vettavalam.

Vettavalam is also a popular movie shooting location for the Tamil film industry; it is preferred for outdoor shooting because of its scenic landscape. Movies like Marumalarchi, Saattai, Tiruvakkarai Sri Vakrakaliamman, etc., are shot here.

Demographics

Vettavalam is a Town Panchayat in district of Tiruvannamalai, Tamil Nadu. Vettavalam is divided into 15 wards for which elections are held every 5 years. The Vettavalam Town Panchayat has population of 15,506 of which 7,681 are males while 7,825 are females as per report released by Census India 2011.

Population of Children with age of 0-6 is 1709 which is 11.02% of total population of Vettavalam (TP). In Vettavalam Town Panchayat, Female Sex Ratio is of 1019 against state average of 996. Moreover, Child Sex Ratio in Vettavalam is around 1013 compared to Tamil Nadu state average of 943. Literacy rate of Vettavalam city is 82.46% higher than state average of 80.09%. In Vettavalam, Male literacy is around 89.81% while female literacy rate is 75.25%.

Culture

Agatheeshwarar temple

Vettavalam, also having a temple of Lord Shiva 'Agatheeswarar Temple'.

St. Immaculate Heart of Mary's Church

Vettavalam has also a church of Immaculate Mary, built in the 18th century.  St. Joseph's Shrine, located in the top of the mount built by Fr.Tharas, is also from the 18th century.

Education

Schools
Government Boys Higher Secondary School
Government Girls Higher Secondary School
St. Mary's Boys Higher Secondary School
St. Aloysius Girls Higher Secondary School
Moorthy Matriculation Higher Secondary School
Sri Aruneshwar Matric School
Good Will Matric School
Dr. Lemire School of Excellence
Vedha Vidyashram School
Panchayat Union Primary Schools(Vettavalam West, North and South)
Panchayat Union Middle School(Vettavalam East)
Lourdu Annai Matriculation School

Colleges
Loyola College

Loyola College, Vettavalam, started in the academic year 2009–2010, was a pioneering initiative of the Jesuit Madurai Province to develop and 
strengthen the Jesuit Chennai Mission in the northern parts of Tamil Nadu.

The College started to function from 15 July 2009 with 195 students, having five Under Graduate Degree Courses (English, B.Com., 
BBA, BCA and B.Sc Computer Science). The official inauguration of the college took place on 31 July 2009, the feast day of St. Ignatius of 
Loyola, the Founder of the Society of Jesus.

References

Cities and towns in Tiruvannamalai district